The Laurelton station is a station on the Long Island Rail Road's Atlantic Branch, in the Laurelton neighborhood of Queens, New York City. It is 14.9 miles (24.0 km) from Penn Station in Midtown Manhattan. The station is located at the intersection of 225th Street and 141st Road.

On weekdays, the station is served by Far Rockaway Branch trains and Long Beach Branch trains bypass the station. This setup is reversed on weekends. As this station is in fare zone 3, it is eligible for the weekend's CityTicket program.

History

Laurelton station was originally built in April 1907. The line was electrified on October 16, 1905, two years before the station opened, and was one of two stations along the Atlantic Branch to replace the former Springfield station, the other being at Higbie Avenue. The original station house was built in connection with the Laurelton Land Company, and the tracks were laid below ground with a floral arrangement on the embankment spelling out the community's name. It was also located northwest of Springfield Junction. On November 26, 1941, the eastbound facilities were relocated south in anticipation of a proposed grade elimination project, but relocated north again on April 10, 1942, when the project was canceled, more than likely due to the war effort. All facilities were again relocated south of the former location between November 16–18, 1948, when the aforementioned grade elimination project was revived. The old depot was razed sometime in 1950. The new elevated structure was opened for westbound trains on October 31, 1950, and eastbound trains on November 27, 1950.

Station layout
This station has one high-level island platform that is eight cars long. There are enclosed waiting rooms and ticket vending machines on street level. The station's current appearance is similar to that of Rosedale station, except that the trim is blue rather than maroon.

References

External links

Old Southern Road from Jamaica Station to Springfield Junction (Arrt's Arrchives)
 224th Street entrance from Google Maps Street View
Platform from Google Maps Street View
Waiting Room from Google Maps Street View

Laurelton, Queens
Long Island Rail Road stations in New York City
Railway stations in Queens, New York
Railway stations in the United States opened in 1907
1907 establishments in New York City